Lady Churchill usually refers to Clementine Ogilvy Spencer-Churchill, Baroness Spencer-Churchill (1885–1977), wife of Winston Churchill.

This title may also refer to:
 Frances FitzRoy, Baroness Churchill (?–?), daughter of Augustus FitzRoy, 3rd Duke of Grafton and wife of Francis Spencer, 1st Baron Churchill
 Jane Spencer, Baroness Churchill (1826–1900), wife of Francis Spencer, 2nd Baron Churchill
 Jeannette, Lady Randolph Churchill (1854–1921), mother of Winston Churchill